Andrey Olegovich Rostenko (born 6 April 1969 in Tashkent, Uzbekistan) is a Russian politician, the former Mayor of Yalta, Crimea. He is the former Head of the Yalta Municipal Administration of the Republic of Crimea of the Yalta International Forum Foundation.

References

1969 births
Living people
Mayors of places in Russia
Mayors of places in Ukraine